Texas Public Radio, or TPR is the on-air name for a group of public radio stations serving south central Texas - including San Antonio and the Texas Hill Country - and the Big Country region of West Central Texas.  All are affiliated with National Public Radio.

The group consists of six stations on the lower end of the FM dial: all-news station KSTX (89.1 MHz, San Antonio), all-classical music KPAC (88.3 MHz, San Antonio), news/classical KTXI (90.1 MHz, Ingram; serving the Hill Country), all-news KTPR (89.9 MHz, Stanton; serving portions of the Big Country and the Permian Basin), all-news KVHL (91.7 MHz, Llano; serving the Highland Lakes), all-news KTPD (89.3 MHz), Del Rio); and one AM station, all-news KCTI (1450 AM, Gonzales; serving the I-10 corridor).

History
KPAC, the oldest station in the group, signed on for the first time on November 7, 1982, as a 24-hour classical music station.  It was owned by the Classical Broadcasting Society of San Antonio. 
As San Antonio's growth exploded during the 1980s, many of the city's new residents wanted more choices in NPR programming.  A group called San Antonio Community Radio had won a construction permit for the second public radio frequency in San Antonio in 1981, but had not been able to get on the air.  To solve this problem, the Classical Broadcasting Society and San Antonio Community Radio merged in the summer of 1988 to form Texas Public Radio.  The new group was able to sign on KSTX for the first time on October 3, 1988, bringing a full-time NPR station to San Antonio.  Before 1988, San Antonio was the largest city in Texas, as well as one of the largest in the nation, without a clear signal from an NPR station.

However, several portions of the Hill Country were still without a clear NPR signal.  To fill in this gap, KTXI was brought online on October 7, 1998, airing a mix of NPR news and classical music.  Its signal covers Fredericksburg, Kerrville and other portions of the central Hill Country.

KTPR was launched on December 3, 2012, to serve the Big Country region, and in October 2013, KVHL began broadcasting to the Highland Lakes area of Texas. KTPD began broadcasting to Del Rio on May 5, 2016, and TPR began broadcasting its programming on KCTI 1450 AM in Gonzales on January 2, 2017.

In September 2020, KTPR moved its city of license and transmitter from Snyder to Stanton and upgraded its transmitter power from 19,000 watts to 100,000 watts.

Local programs
Locally produced programs include Texas Matters, The Source, Fronteras, HearSA, and a popular music program, World Music with Deirdre Saravia.

The KPAC Blog features classical music news and analysis.

The Cinema Tuesdays series is a summertime weekly film event featuring a carefully selected film each week. TPR's Nathan Cone curates the series.

Think Science is a quarterly TPR-hosted panel discussion event that focuses on developments across a wide variety of scientific fields.

Online music programming includes the Lonesome Lounge Sessions and Daystream, featuring local bands.

References

External links

NPR member networks
Texas classical music